Ellenvale is a mostly residential neighbourhood in the Dartmouth area of Halifax Regional Municipality, Nova Scotia. It is located in the east end of Dartmouth in the Woodlawn area.

History 
Along with other residential subdivisions in the Woodlawn area, the Ellenvale subdivision was established in the mid-1950s. By 1955, 400 building lots had been set aside.

In 1967, Ellenvale Junior High School was established, followed by Brookhouse Elementary School in the subsequent year.

Geography

Schools
Brookhouse Elementary School
Ellenvale Junior High School

References

Communities in Halifax, Nova Scotia
Dartmouth, Nova Scotia